Kinemation was one of the first inverse kinematics packages for 3D computer animation, created for Wavefront Technologies' package The Advanced Visualizer (TAV).  In 1995, Wired described Kinemation as "a huge breakthrough in motion animation".  It was used  in the mid-1990s by companies such as Kleiser-Walczak Construction Company (Judge Dredd).  Portions of Kinemation were disassembled and re-assembled into Alias-Wavefront's flagship product Maya.

References

External links
 An Animation That Was made in 1995 with Kinemation, pre-Maya (mirror, original site unavailable)
 Kleiser Walczak Studios

Robotics software
Computer graphics
1990s in robotics